Taviran-e Olya (also Romanized as Ţāvīrān-e ‘Olyā; also known as Ţāvīrān) is a village in Sar Firuzabad Rural District, Firuzabad District, Kermanshah County, Kermanshah Province, Iran. At the 2006 census, its population was 293, in 67 families.

References 

Populated places in Kermanshah County